The 2017 Road to the Kentucky Oaks is a points system by which three-year-old fillies qualified for the 2017 Kentucky Oaks, held on May 5. The point system replaced a previous qualifying system which was based on graded stakes earnings.

Churchill Downs announced the schedule for the 2017 Road to the Kentucky Oaks on September 13, 2016. The only change from the 2016 season is that the Mazarine Stakes is no longer included, bringing the total number of races down to 30.

Standings
The following table shows the points earned in the eligible races. Farrell qualified first with 170 points, earned by winning the Golden Rod, Silverbulletday, Rachel Alexandra and Fair Grounds Oaks. The Kentucky Oaks was won by Abel Tasman, who qualified with 70 points by finishing second in the Santa Ysabel and Santa Anita Oaks.

 Winner of Kentucky Oaks in bold
 Entrants for Kentucky Oaks in pink
 "Also eligible" for Kentucky Oaks in green 
 Sidelined/Inactive/Oaks no longer under consideration in gray

Race Results

Prep season

Championship Series

Notes

See also
2017 Road to the Kentucky Derby

References

Kentucky Oaks
Road to the Kentucky Oaks
Road to the Kentucky Oaks